Kesar Lal  was an Indian politician. He was elected to the Lok Sabha, the lower house of the Parliament of India, from Sawai Madhopur in Rajasthan, as a member of the Swatantra Party.

References

External links
Official biographical sketch in Parliament of India website

India MPs 1962–1967
Lok Sabha members from Rajasthan
1929 births
Possibly living people